The Professional Association of Diving Instructors (PADI) is a recreational diving membership and diver training organization founded in 1966 by John Cronin and Ralph Erickson. PADI courses range from entry level to relatively advanced recreational diver certification, several specialized diving skills courses, usually connected with specific equipment or conditions, some diving related informational courses and a range of recreational diving instructor certifications. They also offer various technical diving courses.  As of 2022, PADI is reported to have issued 29 million scuba certifications.

History 

In 1966, PADI was founded by John Cronin and Ralph Erickson. Cronin was originally a NAUI instructor who decided to form his own organization with Erickson, and to break diver training down into several modular courses instead of the single universal course then prevalent. Erickson developed continuing education scuba courses during this time and wrote the initial issue of the first trade magazine for scuba instructors, The Undersea Journal. Cronin got the idea for PADI's Positive Identification Card at a trade show. PADI established the Master Scuba Diver rank, the industry's first non-instructional rating, in 1973, later launching the modular scuba program. By 1979, PADI was producing 100,000 certifications a year after previously hitting 25,000 a year. PADI was the first organization to use confined water or pool dives for training new divers and introduced the PADI Rescue Diver course and manual for rescue training during the 1980s.

In 1989, PADI founded Project AWARE to help conserve underwater environments. In 1992, Project AWARE Foundation became a registered nonprofit organization with an environmental mission and purpose. PADI continues to partner with PADI AWARE, supporting the organization with in-kind services, donations through its processes and connection to the PADI network of divers, dive professionals and dive centers. PADI AWARE information has been integrated in most courses and divers are offered the chance to exchange their normal certification card for an AWARE-certification card by making a donation to the program when sending in their application for a new certification.

In 2006, PADI was severely criticized by a Coroner's court in the United Kingdom for providing what experts regarded as short and insufficient training.  Although PADI training standards differ from those formerly prevalent in the United Kingdom under the BSAC system, PADI training standards are consistent with World Recreational Scuba Training Council standards.

On 9 August 2012, Lincolnshire Management and Providence Equity Partners jointly acquired PADI from Seidler Equity Partners. In 2015, Providence Equity Partners acquired majority stake of PADI from Lincolnshire Management.

In 2017, Providence Equity Partners LLC sold PADI to Canadian investment firm Altas Partners and French private equity firm Florac for 700 million USD, through an entity called Mandarinfish Holding.

In 2018, PADI launched PADI Travel, an online dive travel resource and booking platform for dive resort and liveaboard packages.

In 2019, PADI reported it had a membership of over 137,000 professional members and 6,600 dive centers, and had awarded more than 27,000,000 diving certifications internationally. PADI operates in 186 countries and
territories. Membership is heavily weighted toward males, but in 2016, the organization experienced a growth of 1.1% in female certifications. Women accounted for 37.2% of all certifications during 2016. The organization hosts Women's Dive Day events across the globe in an effort to increase awareness of women divers.

In November 2020, a teenage diver died following an incident at Lake McDonald in Montana while executing a dive of a PADI Advanced Open Water Diver course. The diver was advised to buy and use a Dry suit, due to the extreme cold, without being qualified for its use. The suit lacked an inflator hose connection, did not seal completely and, coupled with excessive ballast weights used caused their death. In April 2022, a judge in Montana denied PADI's denial of responsibility and must face a jury to decide if it is vicariously liable for the teenager's death. The agency was accused of negligence in its oversight of a member-business.

Training system

PADI courses are performance-based diver training programs, and at the introductory level emphasize practical knowledge, safety and motor skills. The basics of diving physics and physiology are introduced during entry level programs. The details of these concepts are left for later courses when they are necessary for the required competences of the specific training. These practices fall within current modern learning philosophies and receive regular updates via peer review.

The PADI training system is composed of modules with standardized learning objectives divided into theory and practical skills development. Each module is a stand-alone course for which certification is provided to the participant on successful completion of the course. Theory is mainly conveyed by way of self-study using books or digital training using PADI eLearning. All study options are supplemented with video and, in most cases, live instruction to help the participant visualize what they have read. Confirmation of the student diver's level of mastery in standardized knowledge review sessions is carried out by a scuba instructor. The instructor utilizes both written tests and live observation during actual dives to verify a student's knowledge and skills. Practical skills are obtained through confined water training (pools or relatively shallow water) and performance evaluations in open water.

Dive experiences
 Discover Scuba Diving –  an introductory diving experience under the direct supervision of an instructor in controlled conditions.
 PADI Seal Team (Age 8 and above)
 PADI Bubble Maker (Age 8 and above)
 Skin Diver (Snorkeling)
 Discover Rebreather – an introductory confined water experience using a recreational or technical rebreather under the direct supervision of a PADI Rebreather or Tec CCR Instructor.
 Discover Tec – an introductory confined water experience using technical backmount or sidemount equipment.

Certification levels

 Junior Scuba Diver (Age 10 to 14)
 Scuba Diver – subset of the PADI Open Water Diver course, must dive under the direct supervision of a PADI Professional
 Junior Open Water Diver (Age 10 to 14)
 Open Water Diver
 Adventure Diver – exposure to three elective scuba experiences.
 Advanced Open Water Diver – expanded scuba skills through "adventure" dive experience: a "deep" dive (18–30m), an underwater navigation dive and three electives from a large choice.
 Rescue Diver – basic skills in stress management, self rescue and buddy rescue for recreational diving.
 Master Scuba Diver – recognition of selected set of certifications and experience: Advanced Open Water Diver, Rescue Diver, 5 elective specialties and 50 logged dives.
Divemaster
Assistant Instructor
Open Water Scuba Instructor
Specialty Instructor
Master Scuba Diver Trainer
IDC Staff Instructor
Master Instructor
Course Director

Recreational specialty coursesFull Face Mask Diver - learning how to use a full face mask

 Altitude Diver –  open water diving where the surface is 300 meters (1,000 feet) or more above sea level. The training includes making adjustments to the dive plan to compensate for reduced atmospheric pressure, which influences decompression.
 AWARE Coral Reef Conservation 
 AWARE Fish Identification 
 Boat Diver –  Boat terminology, boat diving procedures and etiquette, boat entries and exits, and basic boating safety.
 Cavern Diver
 Deep Diver –  open water diving to maximum depth of 40 metres (130 ft)
 Digital Underwater Photographer
 Diver Propulsion Vehicle
 Drift Diver
 Dry Suit Diver –  introduction to dry suit diving
 Emergency Oxygen Provider Course
 Enriched Air Diver  –  Recreational open circuit diving with Nitrox
 Equipment Specialist –  Routine care and maintenance procedures and scuba equipment storage. Basic repairs and adjustments.
 Ice Diver
 Multilevel Diver –  plan and execute a multi-level dives.

 National Geographic Diver
 Night Diver –  buoyancy control by feel, low light communication and buddy skills, entries, exits and navigation in the dark, and handling a dive light.
 Peak Performance Buoyancy –  trim correctly and maintain neutral buoyancy in mid-water.
 Project AWARE
 Rebreather (Semiclosed)
 Advanced Rebreather
 Search and Recovery
 Self Reliant Diver
 Sidemount Diver
 Underwater Naturalist
 Underwater Navigator –  navigation using natural clues and by following compass headings.
 Underwater Photographer
 Underwater Videographer
 Wreck Diver

Workplace programs
PADI offers a speciality program called Public Safety Diver for divers who are either employed in or serve as volunteers in the public safety diving sector principally within the United States.

First aid programs
PADI via its subsidiary, Emergency First Response, Corp, distributes the following programs in cardiopulmonary resuscitation (CPR) and first aid for both divers and non-divers:
 Primary Care (CPR)
 Secondary Care (First Aid)
 Care for Children
 Region-specific workplaces courses for countries including Australia, the United Kingdom and the United States.

Accreditation and memberships
PADI courses are recognized, recommended and cited by a variety of institutions and organizations throughout the world for both recreational diving and vocational training.

PADI courses are recommended for college credit by ACE. PADI is a member of the United States Recreational Scuba Training Council (RSTC).

Recognitions and equivalencies has been established between PADI and Confédération Mondiale des Activités Subaquatiques, the Colombian Navy, and Fédération Française d'Études et de Sports Sous-Marins (FFESSM). PADI is also  a registered training organisation in Australia.  As of 2012, PADI rescue diver and divemaster programs are included on the United Kingdom's Health and Safety Executive list of  approved diving qualifications.

Those PADI courses aligning with standards published by the International Organization for Standardization (ISO) for ‘Recreational diving services’ were audited by the European Underwater Federation (EUF) Certification Body in 2004 and 2009, and were certified at both times as complying with these standards.

PADI is a member of the following member councils of the World Recreational Scuba Training Council –  the RSTC Canada, the RSTC Europe and the C-Card Council (Japan).

Affiliates and sponsorships
Since 2009, PADI and the Boy Scouts of America (BSA) have maintained a mutual support partnership. In Canada, PADI sponsors the Scouts Canada Scuba Program. Affiliates include:

 Emergency First Response provides CPR and First Aid training both for the lay person and in the workplace.
 Current Publishing Corporation develops marine science programs for high school and upper level educational facilities.
 Diving Science and Technology Corporation (DSAT) is the development arm for the Recreational Dive Planner and PADI's Tec-Rec program.

Citations in professional literature

PADI's instructional methodology is cited in EDUCAUSE's 2012 book, Game Changers: Education and Information Technologies regarding badges as “a symbol or indicator of an accomplishment, skill, quality, or interest. From the Boy and Girl Scouts to PADI diving instruction, to the more recently popular geolocation game Foursquare, badges have been successfully used to set goals, motivate behaviors, represent achievements, and communicate success in many contexts.” 

PADI's environmental emphasis is cited in the 2007 book, New Frontiers in Marine Tourism, in its section, Dive Tourism, Sustainable Tourism and Social Responsibility: A Growing Agenda – Environmental management and education: the case of PADI, (Chapter Seven). “PADI, as well as other diver certification organisations and individual businesses, has put significant resources into conservation and developed public awareness programmes”.

New Frontiers in Marine Tourism also cites in the section entitled Student Scholarships and Social Responsibility: A Growing Agenda for PADI, that “The PADI Scholarship programme … is a good example of the way that various disparate parts of an industry, each with limited resources, can pool their efforts to help more people from developing countries to enter the diving profession… PADI recognises that good relations with the involvement of local people is essential both to business development and to environmental protection.  The scholarship scheme makes entry into the dive business more possible for some students who have the backing of their dive centre.”

See also
 List of diver certification organizations

References

External links
 
 Sport Diver magazine: United Kingdom edition and North American edition – The official magazine of PADI

Organizations established in 1966
Underwater diving training organizations
1966 establishments in California
Diving